Ottawa-Glandorf High School, is a secondary school and only high school part of the Ottawa-Glandorf Local School District. The school is the largest in Putnam County. The school serves students who are in grades 9 through 12 from Glandorf and Ottawa as well as parts of  Greensburg, Liberty, Ottawa, Pleasant and Union Townships.

Ottawa-Glandorf High School was designated "Excellent" or "Excellent with Distinction" (the highest designation given) by the Ohio Department of Education during the last 10 consecutive school years. The district met 24 of 24 state indicators with a 100% graduation rate in 2013.

Athletics
Ottawa-Glandorf is a member of the Western Buckeye League. They are the only school in the county not part of the Putnam County League.

Ohio High School Athletic Association State Championships

 Boys Track and Field – 1972 
 Girls Track and Field – 2002 
 Boys Basketball – 2004, 2008, 2013

OHSAA State Runner-Up
 Boys Track and Field – 1971
 Boys Basketball – 1996, 2022, 2023
 Girls Basketball - 2015, 2016, 2021
 Girls Soccer – 2014, 2021

OHSAA State Final Four
 Baseball - 1979
 Boys Basketball - 1977, 1978, 2012, 2021

 Football - 2009, 2021
 Boys Golf - 1997
 Boys Soccer - 1998
 Girls Track and Field - 2005, 2015

OHSAA Regional Appearances

 Baseball - 1979*
 Boys Basketball - 1977*, 1978*, 1988, 1995, 1996*, 1998, 2001, 2002, 2003, 2004*, 2008*, 2011, 2012*, 2013*, 2014, 2015, 2016
 Girls Basketball - 2003, 2005, 2007
 Boys Cross Country - 1994, 1999, 2000, 2010
 Girls Cross Country - 1995, 1996, 1997, 1998, 2001, 2007
 Boys Golf - 1997*
 Boys Soccer - 1998*, 2007, 2009 (regional finalist; lost to Doylestown Chippewa 3-2)
 Girls Soccer - 2000, 2001, 2002, 2006
 Boys Track and Field - 1971*, 1972*
 Girls Track and Field - 2002*, 2004, 2005*, 2006 (placed 1st at regionals these years)
 Football - 1997, 2000, 2002, 2005, 2006, 2007, 2008, 2009, 2010
 Volleyball - 2004, 2005, 2015

Key: * indicates state semi-finalist, state runner-up, or state champions 
Note: Not all regional appearances are listed for every sport or every appearance for the sports listed.

Tournament notes

Boys Basketball 1996-2010: 
In 1996, Ottawa-Glandorf fell in an overtime thriller to Orrville, 60-59, in the Division II state championship game. Ottawa-Glandorf lost to No. 2 Willard in the regional semi-final, 57-49 in 2001. In 2002, the Titans lost to Lebron James' No. 1 Akron St. Vincent-St. Mary team in the regional final, 77-58. Ottawa-Glandorf fell again to the same No. 1 ranked James dominated Akron St. Vincent-St. Mary team in 2003 in the regional final, 69-59. In 2004, they went on to capture their first Division II state championship defeating Canal Fulton Northwest, 75-42. Canal Fulton Northwest beat No. 9 Dayton Chaminade-Julienne, 65-61 in the state semi-final. In 2008, they captured the Division III state championship with a win over Sugarcreek Garaway. In 2009, they were only twice-beaten but lost to state-power Coldwater in the final minutes of the Division III district final. They lost narrowly to Lima Central Catholic in the 2010 district final.

Football 2008-2009: 
In 2008, Ottawa-Glandorf's football team defeated No. 10 Marion Pleasant in OT to advance to the first regional final in school's history. They later fell to No. 4 Genoa Area, whom advanced to the state tournament. They advanced to their second straight regional championship game in 2009 after blowing past Eastwood 48-3. They later advanced to their first state semi-final game after knocking off Orrville, 21-20.

WBL Championships

State tournament appearances

Notable alumni
 Larry Cox, Former MLB player (Philadelphia Phillies, Seattle Mariners, Chicago Cubs, Texas Rangers)

References

External links
 High School Website
 Western Buckeye League official website

High schools in Putnam County, Ohio
Public high schools in Ohio